Kevin Christopher Foster (January 13, 1969 – October 11, 2008) was an American professional baseball pitcher, who appeared in 100 games in Major League Baseball (MLB) for the Philadelphia Phillies, Chicago Cubs and Texas Rangers in all or parts of seven seasons between  and .

Foster was born in Evanston, Illinois, where he graduated from Evanston Township High School, and attended Kishwaukee College. He was selected by the Montreal Expos in the 29th round of the 1987 Major League Baseball draft, and debuted with two September 1993 games as a late-season call-up for the Phillies. The following spring, he was traded to the Cubs, where appeared in 89 of his 100 MLB games, with 82 starts, and posted all 32 of his career wins. In one of his starts, Foster picked up the Cubs’ first victory against the Chicago White Sox in interleague play, an 8–3 triumph at Comiskey Park on June 16, 1997. Ironically, exactly one year later, Foster worked in his last game as a Cub before returning to the minor leagues. His last MLB trial came during July and August 2001 as a relief pitcher for the Texas Rangers.

As a major leaguer, Foster posted a career 32–30 won–lost record and 4.86 earned run average, with two complete games. In 509 innings pitched, he allowed 500 hits and 220 bases on balls, with 417 strikeouts.

Foster died of renal cancer on October 11, 2008 in Oklahoma City, Oklahoma.

References

External links

1969 births
2008 deaths
African-American baseball players
Baseball players from Illinois
Chicago Cubs players
Daytona Cubs players
Deaths from cancer in Oklahoma
Deaths from kidney cancer
Evanston Township High School alumni
Gate City Pioneers players
Gulf Coast Expos players
Jacksonville Suns players
Iowa Cubs players
Louisville Bats players
Major League Baseball pitchers
Newark Bears players
Oklahoma RedHawks players
Orlando Cubs players
Pawtucket Red Sox players
Philadelphia Phillies players
Reading Phillies players
Rockford Expos players
St. Paul Saints players
Scranton/Wilkes-Barre Red Barons players
Somerset Patriots players
Sportspeople from Evanston, Illinois
Sumter Flyers players
Texas Rangers players
Trenton Thunder players
West Palm Beach Expos players
West Tennessee Diamond Jaxx players
20th-century African-American sportspeople
21st-century African-American people